Valentin Hristov (born 16 March 1956) is a retired Bulgarian heavyweight weightlifter. He is best known for being the first weightlifter to be disqualified from the modern Olympic Games for doping after anabolic steroid testing was introduced at the 1976 Games. He later went on to claim the silver at the 1980 Olympics. Hristov won the world and European titles in 1975 and 1977 and placed second in 1979. In 1975–76 he set nine ratified world records: three in the snatch, four in the clean and jerk and two in the total. 

Hristov originally won the gold medal at the 1976 Olympic Games in Montreal for Bulgaria but had the medal stripped and title revoked  after testing positive for an undisclosed anabolic steroid.  This was before the IOC had banned those who cheated from future Olympic Games by testing positive for the use of PEDs, and the Bulgarian returned to claim the silver medal in 1980.

References 

1956 births
Living people
Bulgarian male weightlifters
Olympic weightlifters of Bulgaria
Weightlifters at the 1976 Summer Olympics
Weightlifters at the 1980 Summer Olympics
Olympic silver medalists for Bulgaria
Olympic medalists in weightlifting
Competitors stripped of Summer Olympics medals
People from Pernik
Medalists at the 1980 Summer Olympics
World record setters in weightlifting
European Weightlifting Championships medalists
World Weightlifting Championships medalists